Etna, originally named "Mill Village", is a small community within the town of Hanover, New Hampshire, in the United States. Etna has a separate ZIP code 03750 from the rest of Hanover, as well as its own fire station, general store, ball field, playground, church, and library with adjacent conserved land and bird sanctuary. The population within Etna's ZIP Code area was 870 at the 2010 census.

Commerce revolves around the Etna General Store and the Etna Post Office. The Appalachian Trail passes a mile or so north of the village before it turns northeast to cross Moose Mountain on its way to Lyme. Etna can be accessed from NH Rt. 120 via Greensboro Road or Great Hollow Road (Etna Road, north of the Lebanon exit (number 18) from Interstate 89), or from Hanover via Trescott Road (E. Wheelock Street).

Etna was the site of the 2001 murders of Dartmouth College professors Half and Susanne Zantop, dubbed the Dartmouth Murders.

Etna General Store
The store, sometimes referred to by locals as simply the Etna General, is the main retail business located in the area. Nearby one can often see a small blue-and-white yard sign that says "Welcome to Metropolitan Downtown Etna." The Etna Post Office was formerly located adjacent to the General Store, but it moved west across Mink Brook in the early 2000s. The store was planning a renovation in 2017, and is built on the site of the original Etna General Store which burned down in 1921.

Notable people 

 Wyatt Allen (b. 1979) Olympic gold medalist, rowing
 Barbara Bedford (b. 1972), Olympic gold medalist, swimming
 John G. Kemeny (1926–1992), mathematician and computer scientist, president of Dartmouth College  
 C. Everett Koop (1916–2013), 13th U.S. Surgeon General
 Robert W. McCollum (1925–2010), virologist; made important discoveries regarding polio and hepatitis
 Robert Morris (1932–2011), cryptographer, computer scientist
 Jodi Picoult (b. 1966), author (My Sister's Keeper, The Pact, and Nineteen Minutes)
 Mary Roach (b. 1959), non-fiction author

References

External links
Etna Library

Hanover, New Hampshire
Unincorporated communities in New Hampshire
Unincorporated communities in Grafton County, New Hampshire